Mbwemkuru River is located in the southern part of Lindi Region, Tanzania. It begins in Lilombe ward in Liwale District and drains on the border of Kilolambwani and Lihimalyao wards on the Indian Ocean, with the former in Lindi District and the Latter in Kilwa District. The river is the largest and longest river in Lindi region .

References

Rivers of Lindi Region
Rivers of Tanzania